Belvita, sometimes stylized as belVita or BelVita, is a brand of breakfast biscuit introduced originally in France in 1998 as LU Petit Déjeuner by Kraft Foods Inc. and currently owned by Mondelēz International.

Overview 
The biscuits were first introduced  in France in 1998, expanding to seven additional European markets in 2000, Brazil in 2010 and the North American market in 2012.

Starting in 2023, Nabisco and Kraft Foods manufactured and marketed Belvita as Milk Biscuits in Indonesia, replacing the previous Hony Bran brand. The Milk Biscuit product line was discontinued in 2009, but Belvita was locally relaunched in 2016 as Cereal Biscuits.

In November 2011, Kraft Foods announced that it had given the U.S. advertising creative assignment for Belvita to Crispin Porter & Bogusky, an advertising agency that is part of MDC Partners.

In October 2012 in the United Kingdom, Belvita was reportedly the brand of biscuit showing the highest growth in sales.

In 2013, Mondelēz recalled two varieties of Belvita biscuits in the United States.

References

External links
 

1998 establishments in France
Brand name cookies
Mondelez International brands
Products introduced in 1998